Bakhtiyor Akhmedovich Ikhtiyarov ( / , ;  28 March 1940 – 21 November 2021) was a Soviet and Uzbek actor.

Career
Ikhtiyarov was born in Bukhara. He started his career as a theatre actor, but in 1964 he starred in Ali Hamroyev's Yor-yor, one of the most successful Uzbek comedies of all time. Following that, he became a well-known actor and regularly appeared in many movies from 1964 on. In 1989, he was given the title People's Artist of the Uzbek SSR.

Personal life 
He was married to the actress,  People's Artist of Uzbekistan  Mariam Ikhtiyarovа (nee Ruzmetova, born in  1939).

Ikhtiyarov died on 21 November 2021 in Tashkent.

Filmography 
 1964: Yor-yor as Bakhtiar
 1969: Oʻtgan kunlar as puppeteer
 1972: The Seventh Bullet as Sagdulla
 1977: The Mischievous Boy as crazy man
 1983: Hot Summer in Kabul as Jamali
 1991: Shikari: The Hunter as Bakhtiar-aka

References

External links 
 
 Экран. Стр. 144  (1964)

1940 births
2021 deaths
Soviet male stage actors
Uzbekistani male stage actors
Soviet male film actors
Uzbekistani male film actors
Uzbeks
People from Bukhara
20th-century Uzbekistani male actors